Zythos turbata is a moth of the family Geometridae first described by Francis Walker in 1862. It is found in southern Myanmar and on Borneo, Sumatra, Java, Peninsular Malaysia and the Philippines (Mindanao, Mindoro, Palawan, Tawi-Tawi Island).

References

External links

Scopulini
Moths described in 1862